Massachusetts Academy may refer to:
 Massachusetts Maritime Academy, a regionally accredited, coeducational, state college
 Massachusetts Academy of Math and Science at WPI, an 11th and 12th grade public high school which is part of Worcester Polytechnic Institute
 Massachusetts Academy (comics), fictional home of Xavier's School for Gifted Youngsters and Generation X
 Massachusetts International Academy, a private high school owned by the government of the People's Republic of China located in Marlborough, Massachusetts